south coast united, wollongong, Australia 1964-1965

Derek Mayers (24 January 1935 – 15 April 2016) was an English footballer, who played as a winger. He played in the English Football League First Division (at the time the top level of English football) for Everton and Preston North End.

Career
Mayers began his career at Everton, being signed straight from school to play for the club. He made his debut in the 1952–53 season, before being called up to do his National Service during the following season, where he represented the army team.

Mayers would return to Everton following his National Service, however he would be transferred to Preston North End in 1957, where he would help them finish 2nd in the 1957–58 Football League First Division.

He'd make over 100 appearances for Preston, however would move to Leeds United after Preston's relegation from the First Division in 1961.

He would stay at Leeds for a year, before having spells with Bury and Wrexham in the football league.

He would also play for Rhyl in the League of Wales and would spend 18 months at South Coast United in Australia.

Death
Mayers died on 15 April 2016 at the age of 81 in Wigan, Greater Manchester.

References

1935 births
2016 deaths
English footballers
English Football League players
Expatriate soccer players in Australia
English expatriates in Australia
Everton F.C. players
Preston North End F.C. players
Leeds United F.C. players
Bury F.C. players
Wrexham A.F.C. players
Rhyl F.C. players
Gold Coast United FC players
Association football wingers